Ofer H. Azar is an economics professor at Ben-Gurion University of the Negev in Beersheba, Israel. He is also the editor-in-chief of the Journal of Behavioral and Experimental Economics. He received his Ph.D. in economics from Northwestern University. He is known for his research in behavioral economics and industrial organization, among other fields. For example, he has published numerous studies on the practice of tipping. These studies include one which estimated that Americans tip about $42 billion per year at full-service restaurants.

References

External links
Ofer Azar's website
Faculty page

Living people
Israeli economists
Academic staff of Ben-Gurion University of the Negev
Northwestern University alumni
Behavioral economists
Academic journal editors
Year of birth missing (living people)